Idir, also rendered as Ider or Igdir or Ikdir, in Iran may refer to:
 Igdir, Iran
 Idir-e Olya
 Idir-e Sofla

See also
 Iğdır (disambiguation)